Ardabil Province is one of the 31 provinces of Iran. It is in the northwest of the country, in Region 3, bordering the Republic of Azerbaijan, and the provinces of East Azerbaijan, Zanjan, and Gilan. Its administrative centre is the city of Ardabil.  The province was established in 1993 from the eastern part of East Azerbaijan.

At the time of the 2006 National Census, the province had a population of 1,209,968 in 281,433 households. The following census in 2011 counted 1,248,488 people in 337,943 households. According to the National Census of 2016, the population of Ardabil province was 1,270,420 in 377,423 households.

Administrative divisions

Cities 
According to the 2016 census, 866,034 people (over 68% of the population of Ardabil province) live in the following cities: Abi Beyglu 6,516, Anbaran 5,757, Ardabil 529,374, Aslan Duz 6,348, Bileh Savar 16,188, Eslamabad 3,068, Fakhrabad 999, Germi 28,967, Hashatjin 5,725, Hir 2,080, Jafarabad 7,226, Khalkhal 39,304, Kivi 7,101, Kolowr 2,347, Kuraim 831, Lahrud 2,149, Meshginshahr 74,109, Moradlu 671, Namin 13,659, Nir 5,873, Parsabad 93,387, Qosabeh 2,095, Razey 1,581, Sareyn 5,459, Tazeh Kand-e Angut 2,645, and Tazeh Kand-e Qadim 2,575.

Geography
Many tourists come to the region for its cool climate (max 35 °C (95° F)) during the hot summer months. The winters are bitterly cold, with temperatures plummeting to −25 °C (-13° F).

Its famous natural region is the Sabalan mountains. The province is considered the coldest province in Iran by many. Large parts of the province are green and forested.

Ardabil's capital stands about 70 km from the Caspian Sea and has an area of 18,011 km². Neighboring the Caspian Sea and the Republic of Azerbaijan, the city is of political and economic significance.

History

The natural features of the province of Ardabil are mentioned in the Avesta, according to which Zoroaster was born by the river Aras and wrote his book in the Sabalan Mountains. During the Islamic conquest of Iran, Ardabil was the largest city in Azarbaijan, and remained so until the Mongol invasion period.

Shah Ismail I started his campaign to nationalize Iran's government and land from here, but consequently announced Tabriz as his capital in 1500 CE. Yet Ardabil remained an important city both politically and economically until modern times.

Culture

Ardabil is the seat of the sanctuary and tomb of Shaikh Safî ad-Dîn, eponym of the Safavid dynasty Kulliye.
It has many hot springs and natural landscapes which attract tourists. The mineral springs of Ardabil are Beele-Darreh, Sareyn, Sardabeh and Booshloo, which are known throughout Iran for their medicinal qualities.
It also has a number of lakes: the largest of which are Ne'or, Shoorabil, ShoorGel, NouShahr and Alooche, which are the habitats of some species of water birds.

Lake Ne'or is located in a mountainous area 48 km south-east of the city of Ardabil. It covers an area of 2.1 km² and has an average depth of 3 metres. It is fed by springs in the lake bed. Lake Shoorabil is located in a hilly area south of the city of Ardabil and covers an area of 640,000 m². The surface of the lake is covered with a thin white layer of minerals, which is useful for healing skin diseases and rheumatism. Near the lake there is the leisure complex of Shoorabil.
Ardabil is a city of great antiquity. Its origins go back 4000 to 6000 years (according to historical research in this city). This city was the capital of Azerbaijan province in different times, but its golden age was in the Safavid period.

One of the most ancient cities in Iran is Meshkin Shahr. It is located in the north-west of Iran in Azerbaijan, 839 kilometers from Tehran. It is the closest city to the Sabalan mountains. In the past, it was called "Khiav", "Orami", and "Varavi".

Colleges and universities
 Ardabil University of Medical Sciences
 Mohaghegh Ardabili University
 Islamic Azad University of Ardabil
 Payam Noor University of Ardabil
 Soureh University of Ardabil
 Islamic Azad University of Khalkhal

Language
The primary language of Ardabil province is Azerbaijani, a Turkic language. Other languages in Ardabil include Tati and Talysh. In and around Khalkhal, there is a significant group of Kurmanji-speaking Kurds known as Gormanj.

See also 

 Lerd tourist village

References

External links
Encyclopedia of Orient About Ardabil

Ardabil entries in the Encyclopædia Iranica

 

Provinces of Iran